The Monastery of Saint Macarius The Great  also known as Dayr Aba Maqār is a Coptic Orthodox monastery located in Wadi El Natrun, Beheira Governorate, about  north-west of Cairo, and off the highway between Cairo and Alexandria.

Ancient history
The monastery was founded in approximately 360 AD by Saint Macarius of Egypt, who was the spiritual father to more than 4,000 monks of different nationalities. The monastery has been continuously inhabited by monks since its 4th-century founding. Several Christian saints and fathers of the early Church were monks at the Monastery of Saint Macarius, including Saint Macarius of Alexandria, Saint John the Dwarf, Saint Paphnutius the Ascetic, Saint Isidore, Saint Arsenius, Saint Moses the Black, Saint Poemen, Saint Serapion among others.

Modern history
In 1969, the monastery entered an era of restoration, both spiritually and architecturally, with the arrival of twelve monks under the spiritual leadership of Father Matta El Meskeen.

Pope Cyril VI ordered this group of monks to leave Wadi El Rayyan and go to the Monastery of Saint Macarius the Great to restore it. At that time only six aged monks were living in the monastery, and its historic buildings were on the verge of collapsing. The new monks were received by the abbot of the monastery, Bishop Michael, Metropolitan of Assiut.

Under Pope Shenouda III, who was himself busily engaged in restoring the Monastery of Saint Pishoy and the Paromeos Monastery, and after fourteen years of constant activity both in reconstruction and spiritual renewal, the monastic community in the Monastery of Saint Macarius numbers about one hundred monks.

The Monastery of Saint Macarius maintains spiritual, academic and fraternal links with several monasteries abroad, including the monastery of Chevetogne in Belgium, Solesmes Abbey and the Monastery of the Transfiguration in France, Bose Monastic Community in Italy, Deir El Harf in Lebanon, and the Convent of the Incarnation in England.

The Monastery of Saint Macarius the Great contains the relics of many saints, such as the Forty-Nine Martyrs of Scetis.

Discovery of relics
During the restoration of the big Church of Saint Macarius, the crypt of Saint John the Baptist and that of Elisha the Prophet were discovered below the northern wall of the church, in accordance with the site mentioned in manuscripts from the 11th and 16th centuries found in the library of the monastery. This is also confirmed by the ecclesiastical tradition of the Coptic Orthodox Church. The relics were gathered in a special reliquary and placed before the sanctuary of Saint John the Baptist in the church of Saint Macarius. A detailed account of this discovery and an assessment of the authenticity of the relics was published by the monastery.

Popes from the Monastery of St. Macarius
This table is a listing of the Popes of the Coptic Orthodox Church that were from the Monastery of St. Macarius or that spent long periods in it.

Former abbot

, Anba Epiphanius, who had been a member of the brotherhood since 1984, was appointed as the bishop and abbot of the Monastery of St. Macarius. He was 64 years old when he died in 2018.

The Coptic Church published a statement to say that Pope Tawadros “mourned in Anba Epiphanius a true monk whose life was steeped in meekness and humbleness; also a scholar who possessed a wealth of knowledge that fruited research and publications in various branches of ecclesiastical studies. The Pope prayed for peace for his soul, and comfort for the St Macarius monk assembly as well as all who loved the late Abbot [...] He was simple in his clothes, his house and his food. Bishop Epiphanius was very simple and he preferred to sit in the last rows,".

Pope Tawadros would also consult the abbot due to his extensive knowledge and authorship. The abbot had attended 20 conferences in five years with the Pope's blessing.

Anba Epiphanius was an ardent follower of Matthew the Poor and it is believed that this led to severe tension within his monastery particularly where the former monk and suspect in the abbot's killing, Wael Saad Tawadros, was concerned.

Forty days after his death, a retreat house was inaugurated by Pope Tawadros II himself, bearing the name of "Anba Epiphanius Retreat House", which welcomes foreign pilgrims from all around the world.

Other monasteries of the Desert of Scetis
 The Monastery of Saint Pishoy
 The Syrian Monastery
 The Paromeos Monastery

See also
Macarius of Egypt
Coptic Orthodox Church
Desert Fathers
Wadi El Natrun
Saint Bashnouna
Father Matta El Meskeen

References

 "About the Monastery". The Monastery of Saint Macarius the Great.

External links

 Official website

Macarius The Great
Macarius The Great
Christian monasteries established in the 4th century
Buildings and structures in Beheira Governorate